Less Is More is an acoustic studio album by Marillion, released on the band's own label on 2 October 2009. A retail version is distributed by Edel Music. The band's 16th studio album, it contains re-arranged songs from the period that Steve Hogarth has been their singer (since 1989) plus the previously unreleased track, "It's Not Your Fault". Despite some positive reviews, the album did not chart in the UK.

Critical reception
The album received positive reviews from the publications Guitarist and Classic Rock, as well as the website AllMusic. Guitarist rated the album 4 out of 5 stars, describing it as "an intimate musical experience" and "a credit to all concerned."

Track listing

Personnel
Steve Hogarth – vocals
Steve Rothery – guitars
Mark Kelly – keyboards
Pete Trewavas – bass
Ian Mosley – drums

Charts

Notes

External links
Entry on marillion.com
 

Marillion albums
2009 albums
Edel Music albums